Cold Brook Feed Mill is a historic grist mill located at Cold Brook in Herkimer County, New York.  It includes the mill, mill dam, flume, and land on both sides of the stream between the mill and dam.  The mill is a simple wood-frame structure built in 1857.  The main block is two story, square structure with a shed roof, and attached is a one-story, plus basement, lean-to, added after 1857.  It is equipped with the original water powered stone grinder and corn sheller.

It was listed on the National Register of Historic Places in 1974.

References

Grinding mills on the National Register of Historic Places in New York (state)
Industrial buildings completed in 1857
Buildings and structures in Herkimer County, New York
Grinding mills in New York (state)
National Register of Historic Places in Herkimer County, New York
1857 establishments in New York (state)